The 1977 Kentucky Derby was the 103rd running of the Kentucky Derby. The race took place on May 7, 1977, with 124,038 people in attendance.

Full results

See also
1977 Preakness Stakes
1977 Belmont Stakes

References

1977
Kentucky Derby
Derby
Kentucky
Kentucky Derby